Field Day is a yearly outdoor music festival in London.  It was first held in Victoria Park in the London Borough of Tower Hamlets on 11 August 2007 and returned there each year until 2017. The 2018 festival moved to Brockwell Park, and in 2019 it was held at Meridian Water in Enfield, with a capacity of 25,000.

It has continuously expanded, and since its inception, has sold out yearly.

Village mentality
The festival hosts an annual village fete titled Village Mentality. Beginning in 2008, the area includes a sack race, tug of war and egg and spoon race. In 2008, the events took place until 5pm, finishing earlier than the rest of the festival. In 2009, the area was extended to include its own musical line-up, playing on the Village Mentality Stage. Acts included Mumford & Sons, Toumani Diabaté and Malcolm Middleton. The area is handled by organiser Tom Baker's partner Natalie Silk. Village Mentality was formerly known as Homefires, who hosted their own London festival until 2007.

Field Day radio
Field Day and Eat Your Own Ears founder Tom Baker, together with radio production company Folded Wing, recorded a series of radio shows in the run up to Field Day festival in 2012. It features sessions and interviews with the performing artists and has been a regular feature of the festival since. Episodes include exclusives interviews and mixes from the likes of Pixies, Grimes, Solange, Mulatu Astatke, Panda Bear, Caribou, Omar Souleyman, Metronomy, John Cooper Clarke, Four Tet, Kurt Vile and many more.

Lineups

2007 festival
The inaugural Field Day festival took place on 11 August 2007, with the first Underage Festival taking place the same weekend. Over fifty artists featured across four stages, as well as a musical bandstand. Artists included the 1990s, Absentee, Adem, Alberta Cross, Andrew Weatherall, Archie Bronson Outfit, Bat for Lashes, Battles, Caribou, Casper C, The Cock N Bull Kid, Crispin Dior, El Plate, Electrelane, Erol Alkan, Euros Childs, Fanfarlo, Filthy Dukes, Florence and the Machine, Foals, Four Tet, Fridge, GoodBooks, Gruff Rhys, Hannah Holland, James Yorkston, Jo Jo de Freq, Justice, Kid Harpoon, Late of the Pier, Laura Marling, Liars, Matt Walsh, Matthew Dear, Miss Odd Kidd, Mystery Jets, Nadia Ksaiba, Patchwork Pirates, The Pictish Trail, Pull Tiger Tail, Skull Juice, The Aliens, The Concretes, The Earlies, The Lovely Jonjo, Vetiver, Warboy, White Rabbits, Young Turks and Zombie Disco Squad. Originally being billed as a capacity of 6,000, the amount was increased to 10,000 shortly before the festival.

2008 festival
The 2008 event took place on 9 August 2008, with the Underage Festival taking place the previous day. The entire site was redesigned by Vanguardia Consulting, who provide specialist advice on sound control. Capacity was increased to 20,000, and bars and toilets across the site were doubled. More than fifty artists were again billed for the festival, including Simian Mobile Disco, Les Savy Fav, Mystery Jets and Laura Marling. The event was headlined by Foals, in what was their first UK headline festival performance. A 25-member brass band was also added as a final addition to the line-up. The event now featured five stages, an increase from the previous year. The main stage was retitled the "Converse Century Stage", to reflect the company's 100-year anniversary in 2008. A similar stage was used at Underage Festival the previous day.

Dan Deacon had been due to play on the NME stage, but was later forced to pull out due to passport issues. Mystery Jets also pulled out due to illness. They were later replaced by Lightspeed Champion.

2009 festival
The 2009 festival took place on 1 August 2009, one day prior to Underage. The first line-up announcements were made on 28 January 2009, when NME announced that Mogwai would headline the event. Four Tet, James Yorkston, Apes and Androids, Malcolm Middleton, Fennesz, Errors and Skream were also announced. Further line-up additions were announced on 7 April 2009, including The Horrors, Little Boots, Santigold and Mystery Jets. Other line-up announcements have been sporadically announced through the festival's Twitter account.

2010 Festival
The 2010 event was confirmed to take place on 31 July 2010, in their fourth annual outing in Victoria Park. On 9 February 2010, it was announced that Phoenix would headline the event, with Amiina, Beth Jeans Houghton, Caribou, Esben and the Witch, Chilly Gonzalez, Corsano and Flowers, Gold Panda, Hypnotic Brass Ensemble, James Holden, Joker & MC Nomad, Max Tundra, Memory Tapes, Mouse on Mars, Pantha Du Prince and Silver Apples also announced to perform. Further acts were announced on 12 March 2010, when Babeshadow, Carte Blanche (DJ Mehdi & Riton), Chapel Club, Hudson Mohawke, Lightspeed Champion, No Age, Simian Mobile Disco, Tamikrest, The Fall, These New Puritans and YucK were added. The festival is set to expand further to six stages, including the Outdoor live stage, Adventures in the Beetroot Field arena, Homefires stage, Bugged Out! arena, Bloggers Delight stage, and the musical bandstand.

For the first time in 2010, Field Day is to take part in a festival 'twinning' scheme, organised by the Association of Independent Festivals (AIF). The initiative encourages twinned festivals to swap artists and cross promote each other's events. Field Day was 'twinned' with the Øya Festival in Oslo, Norway.

2011 Festival
The 2011 event took place on 6 August 2011. The next day, a companion festival took place, with the same organisers and similar stages at the location, under the name The Apple Cart festival.

2012 Festival
The 2012 festival date moved from the traditional August month to Saturday 2 June 2012 (bank holiday weekend). This was due to Victoria Park being used for events to celebrate the London Olympics. The Apple Cart festival took place again on the next-day Sunday.

2013 Festival
Following on from 2012's change in date, Field Day 2013 took place on Saturday 25 May (bank holiday weekend).

2014 Festival
In 2014, Field Day expanded to a two-day event. It took place on the weekend of 7–8 June 2014, headlined by Pixies and Metronomy.

Appearing were:

2015 Festival
The 2015 festival took place on the weekend of 6–7 June 2015, and was headlined by Caribou, Ride and Patti Smith.

2016 Festival 
2016 was the 10th anniversary edition of Field Day. It took place on Saturday 11th and Sunday 12 June 2016. The line up was:

2017 Festival 
The festival was reduced to one day and was on Saturday 3 June. This was the last year in Victoria Park.

2018 Festival 
The 2018 festival moved to Brockwell Park in Herne Hill and took place on 1 and 2 June. The headliners were Erykah Badu, Four Tet, Thundercat and Fever Ray.

2019 Festival 
The 2019 festival was at Meridian Water in Enfield on 7 and 8 June. The headliners were Skepta and Jorja Smith. There was a new system in place for the festival; a Day part and a Late Night part; the Day part of the festival finished around 10.30 pm and the Late Night part of the festival finished around 3 am. The line up was:

Friday 7 June

Saturday 8 June

References

External links
 
Field Day official website
 The Line of Best Fit - 2012 festival photo gallery

Alternative rock festivals
Music festivals in London
Tourist attractions in the London Borough of Tower Hamlets